Standings and Results for Group B of the Regular Season phase of the 2007-08 Euroleague Women basketball tournament.

Main page: EuroLeague Women 2007-08

Standings

Fixtures and results

Game 1
November 7, 2007

Game 2
November 14–15, 2007

Game 3
November 21, 2007

Game 4
November 28–29, 2007

Game 5
December 5–6, 2007

Game 6
December 12, 2007

Game 7
December 19–20, 2007

Game 8
January 9–10, 2008

Game 9
January 16, 2008

Game 10
January 23, 2008

Group C
2007–08 in Russian basketball
2007–08 in Czech basketball
2007–08 in Polish basketball
2007–08 in French basketball
2007–08 in Spanish women's basketball
2007–08 in Croatian basketball